Hickory Creek is a tributary of Dobson Bayou in St. Tammany Parish, Louisiana in the United States.

References

Rivers of Louisiana